Water Warfare ( in Japan) is a first-person shooter video game by Hudson Soft for WiiWare. It is the second game in the genre to be released by Hudson Soft for WiiWare (after Onslaught).

Involving combat with water guns, Hudson has described the family friendly game as a "first-person soaker", which holds up Hudson's core design philosophy that prohibits explicit violence between people playing a game.

Gameplay
Along with replacing firearms with water guns of several types (such as water firing machine guns, sniper rifles and rocket launchers), the game also replaces grenades with water balloons, armor with raincoats, and health bars with wet T-shirts, with health regenerated as the shirt dries in the sun or by the player picking up a towel. The water guns are refilled via drinking fountains situated around each level, with the game featuring 8 maps set amongst nature parks, beaches, playgrounds and a Venetian city.

The game features split-screen multiplayer for 2 players and online multiplayer for up to 8 players. Six multiplayer modes are featured including Battle Royale (survival), Deathmatch, Treasure Chest (capture the flag), a team-based Assault mode and Point Rally (race). The game also features a 38 mission long single player campaign, a spectator mode and bots to play against.

Like other Wii games in the genre, Water Warfare uses the pointer function of the Wii Remote to aim and the Nunchuk to move. The game also supports the Wii Zapper and Classic Controller. Unlike other Wii games, the maps change at random every game. For example, a slide that is on a hill in one game would be somewhere else in another.

Reception

IGN's Daemon Hatfield thought the game was "visually ancient" but still fun, though conversely editor Matt Casamassina stated he thought the game was "a laughably bad, dated, shoddily executed FPS". Wiiloveit.com, on the other hand, had high praises for it, describing it as "a fantastic download for Wii owners, whether young or old".

References

External links
 Hudson's Water Warfare site
 Hudson's Bang Bang Kids site

2009 video games
First-person shooters
Hudson Soft games
Video games developed in Japan
Wii-only games
WiiWare games
Wii Wi-Fi games
Water guns